New Shores is the fourth full-length album by the Swiss band Lunatica. It was released on February 27, 2009.

Track listing

 "New Shores" – 5:19
 "Two Dreamers" – 4:19
 "How Did It Come to This?" – 3:56
 "The Incredibles" – 3:55
 "My Hardest Walk" – 5:59
 "Farewell My Love" – 4:23
 "The Chosen Ones" – 5:17
 "Heart of a Lion" – 3:52
 "Into the Dissonance" – 4:11
 "Winds of Heaven" – 3:52
 "The Day the Falcon Dies" – 5:00
 "Timekeeper (Japanese Edition Bonus Track)" - 4:02

Charts

References

2009 albums
Lunatica albums
Napalm Records albums